Evil Always Ends is a supernatural detective novella by Joseph Payne Brennan.  It was first published in 1982 by Donald M. Grant, Publisher, Inc. in an edition of 750 copies, all of which were signed by the author and the artist.  The book was issued to commemorate Brennan's appearance as Guest of Honor at the 1982 World Fantasy Convention.

Plot introduction
The novella is a supernatural detective story set during the World Fantasy Convention in New Haven, Connecticut.

References

1982 American novels
American mystery novels
American horror novels
Novels set in Connecticut
American novellas
Culture of New Haven, Connecticut
Donald M. Grant, Publisher books